Acetylcholinesterase inhibitors (AChEIs) also often called cholinesterase inhibitors, inhibit the enzyme acetylcholinesterase from breaking down the neurotransmitter acetylcholine into choline and acetate, thereby increasing both the level and duration of action of acetylcholine in the central nervous system, autonomic ganglia and neuromuscular junctions, which are rich in acetylcholine receptors. Acetylcholinesterase inhibitors are one of two types of cholinesterase inhibitors; the other being butyryl-cholinesterase inhibitors.
Acetylcholinesterase is the primary member of the cholinesterase enzyme family.

Acetylcholinesterase inhibitors are classified as reversible, irreversible, or quasi-irreversible (also called pseudo-irreversible).

Mechanism of action

Organophosphates 
Organophosphates like TEPP and sarin inhibit cholinesterases, enzymes that hydrolyze the neurotransmitter acetylcholine.

The active centre of cholinesterases feature two important sites, namely the anionic site and the esteratic site. After the binding of acetylcholine to the anionic site of the cholinesterase, the acetyl group of acetylcholine can bind to the esteratic site. Important amino acid residues in the esteratic site are a glutamate, a histidine, and a serine. These residues mediate the hydrolysis of the acetylcholine.

At the esteratic site the acetylcholine is cleaved, which results in a free choline moiety and an acetylated cholinesterase. This acetylated state requires hydrolysis to regenerate itself.

Inhibitors like TEPP modify the serine residue in the esteratic site of the cholinesterase.

This phosphorylation inhibits the binding of the acetyl group of the acetylcholine to the esteratic site of the cholinesterase. Because the acetyl group can't bind the cholinesterase, the acetylcholine can't be cleaved. Therefore, the acetylcholine will remain intact and will accumulate in the synapses. This results in continuous activation of acetylcholine receptors, which leads to the acute symptoms of TEPP poisoning. The phosphorylation of cholinesterase by TEPP (or any other organophosphate) is irreversible. This makes the inhibition of the cholinesterase permanent.

The cholinesterase gets irreversible phosphorylated according to the following reaction scheme

E + PX <=> E-PX ->[k_3] EP + X 

In this reaction scheme the E indicates the cholinesterase, PX the TEPP molecule, E–PX the reversible phosphorylated cholinesterase, k3 the reaction rate of the second step, EP the phosphorylated cholinesterase and X the leaving group of the TEPP.

The irreversible phosphorylation of the cholinesterase occurs in two steps. In the first step the cholinesterase gets reversibly phosphorylated. This reaction is very fast. Then the second step takes place. The cholinesterase forms a very stable complex with TEPP, in which TEPP is covalently bound to the cholinesterase. This is a slow reaction. But after this step the cholinesterase is irreversibly inhibited.

The time dependent irreversible inhibition of the cholinesterase can be described by the following equation.

 

In this formula, E is the remaining enzyme activity, E0 is the initial enzyme activity, t is the time interval after mixing of the cholinesterase and the TEPP, KI is the dissociation constant for cholinesterase-TEPP complex (E–PX) and I is the TEPP concentration.

The reaction mechanism and the formula above are both also compatible for other organophosphates. The process occurs in the same way.

Furthermore, certain organophosphates can cause OPIDN, organophosphate-induced delayed polyneuropathy. This is a disease, which is characterized by degeneration of axons in the peripheral and central nervous system. This disease will show a few weeks after contamination with the organophosphate. It is believed that the neuropathy target esterase (NTE) is affected by the organophosphate which induces the disease. However, there are no references found, which indicate that TEPP is one of the organophosphates that can cause OPIDN.

Uses
Acetylcholinesterase inhibitors:
 Occur naturally as venoms and poisons (e.g. onchidal)
 Are used as weapons (nerve agents)
 Are used medicinally:
 To treat myasthenia gravis. In myasthenia gravis, they are used to increase neuromuscular transmission.
 To treat glaucoma
 To treat postural tachycardia syndrome
 As an antidote to anticholinergic poisoning
 To reverse the effect of non-depolarising muscle relaxants
 To treat neuropsychiatric symptoms of diseases such as Alzheimer's disease, particularly apathy
 To increase chances of lucid dreaming (by prolonging REM sleep)
 To treat Alzheimer's disease, the Lewy body dementias and Parkinson's disease. In these neurodegenerative conditions AChEIs are primarily used to treat the cognitive (memory and learning deficits mostly) symptoms of dementia. These symptoms are attenuated due to the role of acetylcholine in cognition in the CNS. There is some evidence to suggest that AChEIs may attenuate psychotic symptoms (especially visual hallucinations) in Parkinson's disease.
 To treat cognitive impairments in patients with schizophrenia. There is some evidence to suggest efficacy in treating positive, negative and affective symptoms.
 As a treatment for autism and to increase the percentage of rapid eye movement sleep in autistic children, in line with the mechanism by which they encourage lucid dreaming.
 : The hunt for resistance genes in Rhipicephalus microplus has been hampered by high copy number in the three AChEs involved. Bellgard et al. 2012, Temeyer et al. 2012, and Bendele et al. 2015 all investigate such populations and encounter difficulty confirming the involvement of these three due to copy number.

Guideline recommendations 
The clinical guidelines for medication management in people with dementia recommend trialing an AChE inhibitor for people with early to mid stage dementia. These guidelines, known as the Medication Appropriateness Tool for Comorbid Health conditions in Dementia (MATCH-D), suggest that these medicines are at least considered.

Side effects

Some major effects of cholinesterase inhibitors:
 Actions on the parasympathetic nervous system, (the parasympathetic branch of the autonomic nervous system) may cause bradycardia, hypotension, hypersecretion, bronchoconstriction, GI tract hypermotility, and decrease intraocular pressure, increase lower esophageal sphincter (LES) tone
 Cholinergic crisis.
 Actions on the neuromuscular junction may result in prolonged muscle contraction.
 The effects of neostigmine on postoperative nausea and vomiting are controversial and there is not a clear linkage in clinical practice, however, there is good evidence to support the reduction in risk when anticholinergic agents are administered.

Administration of reversible cholinesterase inhibitors is contraindicated with those that have urinary retention due to urethral obstruction.

Overdose
Hyperstimulation of nicotinic and muscarinic receptors.

Titration phase
When used in the central nervous system to alleviate neurological symptoms, such as rivastigmine in Alzheimer's disease, all cholinesterase inhibitors require doses to be increased gradually over several weeks, and this is usually referred to as the titration phase. Many other types of drug treatments may require a titration or stepping up phase. This strategy is used to build tolerance to adverse events or to reach a desired clinical effect. This also prevents accidental overdose and is therefore recommended when initiating treatment with drugs that are extremely potent and/or toxic (drugs with a low therapeutic index).

Examples

Reversible inhibitor
Compounds which function as reversible competitive or noncompetitive inhibitors of cholinesterase are those most likely to have therapeutic uses. These include:
 Some organophosphates not listed under "Irreversible" below
 Carbamates
 Physostigmine
 Neostigmine
 Pyridostigmine
 Ambenonium
 Demecarium
 Rivastigmine
 Phenanthrene derivatives
 Galantamine
 Caffeine – noncompetitive (also an adenosine receptor antagonist)
 Rosmarinic acid – ester of caffeic acid. Found in plants species of family Lamiaceae.
 Alpha-pinene – noncompetitive reversible 
 Piperidines
 Donepezil
 Tacrine, also known as tetrahydroaminoacridine (THA')
 Edrophonium
 Huperzine A
 Ladostigil
 Ungeremine
 Lactucopicrin
 Acotiamide
 Hybrid/bitopic ligands

Comparison table

Quasi-irreversible inhibitor
Compounds which function as quasi-irreversible inhibitors of cholinesterase are those most likely to have use as chemical weapons or pesticides.

 Organophosphates
 Echothiophate
 Diisopropyl fluorophosphate
 Cadusafos
 Chlorpyrifos
 Cyclosarin
 Dichlorvos
 Dimethoate
 Metrifonate (irreversible)
 Sarin
 Soman
 Tabun
 VX
 VE
 VG
 VM
 Diazinon
 Malathion
 Parathion
 Carbamates
 Aldicarb
 Bendiocarb
 Bufencarb
 Carbaryl
 Carbendazim
 Carbetamide
 Carbofuran
 Carbosulfan
 Chlorbufam
 Chloropropham
 Ethiofencarb
 Formetanate
 Methiocarb
 Methomyl
 Oxamyl
 Phenmedipham
 Pinmicarb
 Pirimicarb
 Propamocarb
 Propham
 Propoxur
 Atypical inhibitors
 Onchidal
 Coumarins

See also 
 Pesticide poisoning
 Parathion S

References

External links 
 
 Acetylcholinesterase: A gorge-ous enzyme QUite Interesting PDB Structure article at PDBe